John Gardner may refer to:

Arts and literature
John Gardner (American writer) (1933–1982), American novelist and educator, author of Grendel
John Gardner (British writer) (1926–2007), British author of spy and mystery novels, former official James Bond author
John Gardner (composer) (1917–2011), British composer
John Lowell Gardner (1837–1898), patron of the arts
John Gardner (boat builder) (1905–1995), American nautical historian

Law, education and government
John Gardner (Rhode Island governor) (1697–1764), Deputy Governor, Colony of Rhode Island
John Gardner (Australian politician), Australian Liberal Party MP for the South Australian seat of Morialta since 2010
John Gardner (Continental Congress) (1747–1808), American farmer, Rhode Island delegate to Continental Congress
John Gardner (legal philosopher) (1965–2019), Professor of Jurisprudence, University of Oxford
John A. Gardner, American physicist and developer of Gardner–Salinas braille codes
John Dunn Gardner (1811–1903), British Member of Parliament, 1841 to 1847 
John Fentress Gardner (1912–1998), American author and educator
John J. Gardner (1845–1921), American politician representing New Jersey in the United States House of Representatives, 1885 to 1893
John W. Gardner (1912–2002), U.S. Secretary of Health, Education, and Welfare during the Great Society, founder of Medicare and Public Broadcasting
John P. Gardner, judge and politician in South Carolina

Others
John Gardner known as Akshay Anand, Indian actor of British origin
John D. Gardner, lieutenant general in the U.S. Army
John L. Gardner (brigadier general) (1793–1869), brigadier general in the US Army
John Albert Gardner (born 1979), American double murderer
John Gardner (Texas Ranger) (1845–1926), Texas Ranger, cowboy, Indian fighter and trail boss
John Twiname Gardner (1854–1914), English doctor and composer
John L. Gardner (boxer), British boxer
John Gardner (footballer) (born 1946), Australian rules footballer
John Gardner (minister) (1809–1899), Presbyterian minister in South Australia, Tasmania and Victoria
John Gardner (tennis), Australian tennis player
John Gardner (rugby union) (1870–1909), New Zealand rugby union player

See also
Jack Gardner (disambiguation)
John Gardiner (disambiguation)
John Gardener (disambiguation)